Lake Elsie is a lake in Richland County, in the U.S. state of North Dakota.

The lake was named for Elsie Hankinson, the daughter of the founder and namesake of Hankinson, North Dakota.

See also
List of lakes in North Dakota

References

Lakes of North Dakota
Bodies of water of Richland County, North Dakota